Hakea bakeriana is a shrub in the family Proteaceae and is endemic to the Central Coast of New South Wales. It is a dense shrub with sharply pointed, cylinder-shaped leaves and pink to crimson flowers in groups of between four and twelve. The fruit is a rough, wrinkled follicle which terminates in a short beak.

Description
It has a lignotuber from which it can resprout after fire. Smaller branches are densely covered in matted soft hairs. Flowers often appear below the leaves or from old wood. Pinkish-white to deep pink flowers appear from late autumn to early spring. Woody fruit have a rough and deeply wrinkled surface with paler blister-like protuberances. Fruit terminate in a beak either small and smooth or obscure.

Taxonomy and naming
This species was first formally described by Ferdinand von Mueller and Joseph Maiden in 1892 from a specimen collected on "a barren patch of ground close to the bank of a creek at Wallsend". The description was published in the Macleay Memorial Volume of the Linnean Society of New South Wales. The specific epithet honours Richard Thomas Baker, teacher, economic botanist and later a curator of Sydney's Technological Museum.

Distribution and habitat
Hakea bakeriana  grows in heath, sclerophyll forest and in dry forests on the coast and nearby ranges of New South Wales between Newcastle and Glenorie.

Use in horticulture
Hakes bakeriana has been grown for many years by native plant enthusiasts and is hardy in a range of soils and climates although does best in a sunny position. It is easily grown from seed but because of the species' restricted distribution, seed may be difficult to obtain.

References

bakeriana
Flora of New South Wales
Plants described in 1892
Taxa named by Ferdinand von Mueller
Taxa named by Joseph Maiden